Daniel Escudero Pizarro (29 December 1941 – 20 July 2021) was a Chilean footballer who played as a forward.

He is top goalscorer in the history of Everton de Viña del Mar.

Honours
 Primera División de Chile Top-Scorer: 1964

References

1941 births
2021 deaths
Chilean Primera División players
Everton de Viña del Mar footballers
Unión La Calera footballers
San Luis de Quillota footballers
Association football forwards
Chilean footballers
Sportspeople from Viña del Mar